Materialise Mimics is an image processing software for 3D design and modeling, developed by Materialise NV, a Belgian company specialized in additive manufacturing software and technology for medical, dental and additive manufacturing industries. Materialise Mimics is used to create 3D surface models from stacks of 2D image data. These 3D models can then be used for a variety of engineering applications. Mimics is an acronym for Materialise Interactive Medical Image Control System. It is developed in an ISO environment with CE and FDA 510k premarket clearance. Materialise Mimics is commercially available as part of the Materialise Mimics Innovation Suite, which also contains Materialise 3-matic, a design and meshing software for anatomical data. The current version is 24.0(released in 2021), it supports Windows 10, Windows 7, Vista and XP in x64.

Process
Materialise Mimics calculates surface 3D models from stacked image data such as Computed Tomography (CT), Micro CT, Magnetic Resonance Imaging (MRI), Confocal Microscopy, X-ray and Ultrasound, through image segmentation. The ROI, selected in the segmentation process is converted to a 3D surface model using an adapted marching cubes algorithm that takes the partial volume effect into account, leading to very accurate 3D models. The 3D files are represented in the STL format.

Uploading Data 
DICOM data from CT or MRI images can be uploaded into Materialise Mimics in order to begin the segmentation process. From this data, 3 different views are present: the coronal, axial, and sagittal views. Another window is present to display 3D objects.

Mask Creation 
The "New Mask" tool can be used to highlight specific anatomy from the DICOM data.

Printing Models 
Models can be sent to 3D printers in the form of STLs.

Gallery

See also
3D modeling
3D Slicer
Computer representation of surfaces
Computed tomography
Medical imaging

References

External links
 
 User community

Biomedical engineering
Windows graphics-related software
3D graphics software
Computer-aided design software